The 2015–16 Oregon State Beavers men's basketball team represented Oregon State University in the 2015–16 NCAA Division I men's basketball season. The Beavers were led by second-year head coach Wayne Tinkle, and played their home games at Gill Coliseum in Corvallis, Oregon as members of the Pac-12 Conference. The Beavers finished the season 19–13, 9–9 in Pac-12 play to finish in a three-way tie for sixth place. They defeated Arizona State in the first round of the Pac-12 tournament before losing to California in the quarterfinals. OSU received an at-large bid to the NCAA tournament as the No. 7 seed in the West Region, marking the Beavers' first NCAA Tournament appearance since 1990. The Beavers lost in the first round of the Tournament to VCU.

Previous season 
The Beavers finished the 2014–15 season 17–14, 8–10 in Pac-12 play to finish in seventh place. OSU lost to Colorado in the first round of the Pac-12 tournament. They received an invitation to the College Basketball Invitational tournament, but declined.

Off-season

Departures

2015 recruiting class

Roster

Schedule

|-
!colspan=12 style="background:#; color:#;"| Exhibition

|-
!colspan=12 style="background:#; color:#;"| Non-conference regular season

|-
!colspan=12 style="background:#; color:white;"| Pac-12 regular season

|-
!colspan=12 style="background:#;"| Pac-12 tournament

|-
!colspan=12 style="background:#;"| NCAA tournament

References

Oregon State Beavers men's basketball seasons
Oregon State
2015 in sports in Oregon
Oregon State Beavers men's basketball
Oregon State